The 2011 Bayern Rundfahrt (2011 Tour of Bavaria) was the 32nd edition of the Bayern Rundfahrt, an annual cycling road race. Departing from Pfarrkirchen on 25 May, it concluded in Moosburg on 29 May. The 798.2 km long stage race was part of the 2010–11 UCI Europe Tour, and was rated as a 2.HC event. Geraint Thomas of Team Sky won the general classification, the first Briton to win the competition.

Teams
18 teams were invited to participate in the tour: 8 UCI ProTeams, 6 UCI Professional Continental Teams and 4 UCI Continental Teams.

Stages

Stage 1
25 May 2011 – Pfarrkirchen to Freystadt,

Stage 2
26 May 2011 – Freystadt to Bad Gögging,

Stage 3
27 May 2011 – Bad Gögging to Aichach,

Stage 4
28 May 2011 – Friedberg,  individual time trial (ITT)

Stage 5
29 May 2011 – Friedberg to Moosburg,

Classification leadership

Final standings

General classification

Points classification

Mountains classification

Young rider classification

Team classification

References
General

Specific

External links
Bayern-Rundfahrt homepage 

2011
2011 in German sport
2011 UCI Europe Tour